The Rendezvous Docking Simulator, also known as the Real-Time Dynamic Simulator, is a simulator at the Langley Research Center. It was constructed for the Gemini program in Building 1244 and it became operational in June 1963 at a cost of $320,000 and later reconfigured for the Apollo program. The simulator consists of a gantry frame, with an overhead carriage from which test craft were suspended by cables. A gimbal was powered hydraulically and was capable of changing pitch and yaw at a rate of 1 radian per second or roll at 2 radians per second.

It is the only surviving simulator from the NASA Gemini and Apollo space programs that was used by astronauts to practice docking of space capsules with other vessels.  Ability to dock reliably with the lunar landing module was a crucial skill essential for the mission to return from the moon. The docking simulator was used alongside the Projection Planetarium in training exercises.

It was declared a National Historic Landmark in 1985.

Currently it is stored, hanging from the rafters in Building 1244, a vast hangar at Langley, and there are no plans for it otherwise.

See also
List of National Historic Landmarks in Virginia
National Register of Historic Places listings in Hampton, Virginia

References

External links

Rendezvous Docking Simulator, Langley, one photo at Virginia DHR
Aviation: From Sand Dunes to Sonic Booms, a National Park Service Discover Our Shared Heritage Travel Itinerary
NASA Langley Cultural Resources: Rendezvous Docking Simulator

Transportation buildings and structures on the National Register of Historic Places in Virginia
National Historic Landmarks in Virginia
Buildings and structures in Hampton, Virginia
Langley Research Center
National Register of Historic Places in Hampton, Virginia
Transportation buildings and structures on the National Register of Historic Places